Diana Sadovnykova (born 26 July 1971) is a Ukrainian basketball player. She competed in the women's tournament at the 1996 Summer Olympics.

References

1971 births
Living people
Ukrainian women's basketball players
Olympic basketball players of Ukraine
Basketball players at the 1996 Summer Olympics
Sportspeople from Sevastopol